Donald Baker or Don Baker may refer to:
 Don Baker (musician) (born 1950), Irish musician and actor
 Donald Baker, plaintiff in the U.S. court case Baker v. Wade
 Don Baker (The Atheist Experience), atheist activist and co-host of The Atheist Experience
 Donald Baker (bishop) (1882–1968), Anglican bishop of Bendigo, Australia